The human right abuses and some of the massacres in the history of Jammu and Kashmir are listed below.

1931
Dogra rule
1931 kashmir agitation

1947
Partition of India
1947 Jammu massacres
1947-1948 Rajouri massacre
1947 Mirpur massacre

1989 
Militants
Exodus of Kashmiri Hindus

1990
Indian security forces

Gawakadal massacre 
Handwara massacre
Zakoora and Tengpora massacre
Hawl Massacre

1993
Indian security forces
Bijbehara massacre
Sopore massacre
1993 Lal Chowk fire

1994
Indian security forces
Kupwara massacre

1995 
Militants
1995 kidnapping of western tourists in Jammu and Kashmir

1997
Militants
1997 Sangrampora massacre

1998
Militants
1998 Wandhama massacre
1998 Prankote massacre
1998 Champanari massacre

2000
Militants
2000 Amarnath pilgrimage massacre
Chittisinghpura massacre

2001
Militants

2001 Kishtwar massacre
2001 Kot Charwal massacre

2002
Militants

2002 Qasim Nagar massacre
2002 Kaluchak massacre
2002 Raghunath temple attacks

2003
Militants

2003 Nadimarg massacre

2004
Militants

2004 Teli Katha massacre

2006
Militants

2006 Doda massacre

2008
Indian Security Forces
Amarnath land transfer controversy

2017
Militants

 2017 Amarnath Yatra attack

2018 
Militants

 Sunjuwan Terror Attack 2018

2019
Militants

 2019 Pulwama attack
 2019 Kulgam massacre

See also
Human rights abuses in Jammu and Kashmir
Rape in Kashmir conflict

References 

Massacres